Stjepan Mesaros, best known as Steve Nelson (1903– December 11, 1993), was a Croatian-born American political activist. Nelson achieved public notoriety as the political commissar of the Abraham Lincoln Brigade in the Spanish Civil War and as a leading functionary of the Communist Party, USA. Nelson is best remembered for having been prosecuted and convicted under the Smith Act in 1953.

Background

Stjepan Mesaros (sometimes known as "Stephen Mesarosh") was born in Subocka, Austro-Hungarian Empire on January 1, 1903 of ethnic Hungarian extraction.  The Communist Party of the United States would later claim he was born in Steelton, Pennsylvania.

Mesaros emigrated to the United States of America in 1919 with his mother and three sisters. He became a shipyard worker in Philadelphia.

Career

Communist Party

Upon arrival in the States, Nelson started working in a Pittsburgh, Pennsylvania slaughterhouse and meat-packing plant. A succession of blue-collar jobs followed.

In 1923, by now using the Americanized name "Steve Nelson," he joined the youth section of the American Communist Party, the Young Workers League. He went on to join the adult Workers (Communist) Party in 1925. That year, he moved (with his new wife) to Detroit, where he worked in the auto industry as an assembly line worker and union organizer. In 1928, they moved to New York City, where Nelson studied Marxism at the New York Workers School. With the onset of the Great Depression, husband and wife worked for the Communist Party full-time.

In 1930, Nelson organized the International Unemployment Day demonstration on March 6, 1930, at which he, Joe Dallet and Oliver Law were beaten up and arrested. Two weeks he was among the 75,000 demonstrators to demand unemployment insurance.

In 1931, Nelson and his wife were sent to Moscow for two years at the International Lenin School. He became a courier for the Communist International (Comintern), delivering documents and funds to Germany, Switzerland and China. In 1933, they returned to the United States and settled in Wilkes-Barre.

Spanish Civil War
In 1937, Nelson immediately tried to join the Abraham Lincoln Brigade but had to stay in Pennsylvania, where he agitated coal miners. After the severe setback at Jarama, Nelson, Joe Dallet and 23 others were allowed to fight in Spain. At first arrested in France, they reached Spain climbing the Pyrenees mountains and met the International Brigades at Albacete in May 1937. Nelson started the war as political commissar of the Lincoln Battalion. After heavy losses at Brunete, the Abraham Lincoln Battalion and the George Washington Battalion were merged into the Lincoln–Washington Battalion. Mirko Markovicz, a Yugoslav-American, was appointed as commander of the Lincoln–Washington Battalion and Nelson became his political commissar. In August 1937 the American forces were reorganized. Nelson was promoted to XV International Brigade commissarand Robert Hale Merriman became brigade chief of staff. Hans Amlie became commander of the Lincoln–Washington Battalion. In the fighting at Belchite, which started very badly, only two soldiers of 22 survived the first attempt to take the church of the town. Nelson then led his men in a successful diversionary attack; and Amlie's men entered the fortified town. Nelson was wounded, shot in the face and leg, and Merriman and Amlie received head wounds. After recovering in Valencia, Nelson was given the task to escort prominent visitors (such as John Bernard, Dorothy Parker and Ernest Hemingway).

In the 1940s, Nelson rose to the top ranks of the communist party. After years on the West Coast, the Nelsons returned east, when he was elected to the National Board of the party. He settled in Pittsburgh as District Secretary of Western Pennsylvania.

Steve Nelson moved to California and in 1942 he became chairman of the San Francisco branch of the Communist Party of the United States.

Espionage

In 1942, Nelson also became involved in espionage activities, particularly the Manhattan Project: One part of Nelson's task was to gather information on the atomic bomb project. He was seen and overheard meeting with Communist scientists working at the radiation laboratory at Berkeley. Information gleaned from FBI bugging and wiretaps indicated that several had discussed the atomic bomb project with him. Nelson made notes of what the scientists told him regarding their work, and he was subsequently observed passing materials, which the FBI assumed were his notes, to a Soviet intelligence officer operating under diplomatic cover at the USSR's San Francisco consulate."  One of the scientists identified was Joseph Weinberg, who worked at the Radiation Laboratory at the University of California.  FBI officials bugged Nelson's residence and discovered that Weinberg had delivered "highly secret information regarding experiments being conducted at the Radiation Laboratory, Berkeley, pertaining to the atomic bomb." Investigators reported that Nelson had "delivered this classified information to Soviet consular officer Ivan Ivanov for transmittal to the Soviet Union."

In April 1943, Nelson met with Vassili Zarubin, the most senior NKVD agent in the United States. Nelson was running a secret "control commission" to find informants and spies in the Californian branch of the Communist Party. During the meeting, Zarubin delivered money. The FBI, which had bugged Nelson's home, was able to listen in. The FBI thereby learned that the purpose of their efforts was to obtain information for transmittal to the Soviet Union."

Overall, the FBI deemed a failure this particular, early effort by the Soviet to obtain atomic information about the Manhattan Project.

(Prior to this trial, Emanuel Hirsch Bloch had represented Nelson in other legal efforts, as attested by Bloch. On December 14, 1948, Bloch appeared before the House Un-American Activities Committee (HUAC) as counsel for Marion Bachrach. At that time, Bloch answered questions that confirmed he had represented Steve Nelson in the past.  Nelson was (according to a HUAC committee member) a "head of the Communist Party in western Pennsylvania, eastern Ohio, and northern West Virginia. He  now lives in Harmarville, PA. I believe he served the Communist Party for a number of years as a sort of secretary of labor. He is an expert on so-called foreign groups and is currently working to keep the Tito Comimmists from jumping the line here as they did abroad"

In August 1950, after a raid on the Pittsburgh Party Headquarters, Nelson and two local party leaders were arrested and charged under the 1919 Pennsylvania Sedition Act for attempting to overthrow the state and federal government.  

Nelson initially received a 20-year prison sentence, $10,000 in fines and $13,000 in prosecution costs. He was jailed in Pittsburgh for seven months and then released on bail pending his appeal.  In 1953 he and five others were indicted under the Federal Smith Act. This the sentence was  5 years of imprisonment  and $10,000 in fines. All six were granted bail.  In 1956 in Pennsylvania v. Nelson, the United States Supreme Court overturned the Pennsylvania Sedition Act, saying that the Federal Smith Act superseded this and all similar state laws.  In the same year testimony at the first trial was found to have been perjured and a new trial was granted. In 1957, the government dropped all charges against the defendants.

Later years
In 1963 he became the National Commander of the Veterans of the Abraham Lincoln Brigade (VALB).  In 1975 he retired with his wife of 50 years to a home he had built in Truro, Massachusetts on Cape Cod.

Personal life and death

In 1925, Nelson met Margaret Yaeger, a typist in the Pittsburgh office of the Party.

Nelson died age 90 on December 11, 1993.

Works

 The Volunteers: A Personal Narrative of the Fight Against Fascism in Spain (New York: Masses and Mainstream, 1953)
 The 13th Juror: The Inside Story of My Trial (New York: Masses and Mainstream, 1955)

See also

 Americans Battling Communism
 Foley Square trial
 William Albertson
 Albertson v. Subversive Activities Control Board

References

External links

 Cecil Eby, Comrades and Commissars: The Lincoln Battalion in the Spanish Civil War. University Park, PA: Penn State University Press, 2007.
 Steve Nelson, James R. Barrett, and Rob Ruck, Steve Nelson, American Radical. Pittsburgh, PA: University of Pittsburgh Press, 1981.
 Historical/Biographical Note, Steve Nelson Papers, Tamiment Library
 Pennsylvania -v- Nelson, 350 U.S. 497 (1956)
 Mesarosh -v- United States, 352 U.S. 808 (1956)
 Tamiment Library - Oral Histories - Steve Nelson

1903 births
1993 deaths
Abraham Lincoln Brigade members
American activists
American communists
Yugoslav emigrants to the United States
Members of the Communist Party USA
International Lenin School alumni